The 2016 FIBA U16 European Championship was the 30th edition of the European Under-16 Basketball Championship. Sixteen teams participated in the competition, held in Radom, Poland, from 12 to 20 August 2016. Bosnia and Herzegovina, the defending champions, were relegated to the 2017 Division B.

Participating teams

  (Winners, 2015 FIBA Europe Under-16 Championship Division B)

  (Runners-up, 2015 FIBA Europe Under-16 Championship Division B)

  (3rd place, 2015 FIBA Europe Under-16 Championship Division B)

First round
In this round, sixteen teams are allocated in four groups of four teams each. All teams advance to the Playoffs.

Group A

Group B

Group C

Group D

Knockout stage

Bracket

5th–8th place bracket

9th–16th place bracket

Final standings

Awards 

All-Tournament Team

  Marko Pecarski
  Eray Akyuz
  Dovydas Giedraitis
  Luka Šamanić
  Usman Garuba

References

External links
Tournament statistics at FIBA Archive
FIBA official website

  
FIBA U16 European Championship
2016–17 in European basketball
2016–17 in Polish basketball
International youth basketball competitions hosted by Poland
Radom
August 2016 sports events in Europe